Number 332 Squadron of the Royal Air Force was formed at RAF Catterick in the North Riding of Yorkshire on 16 January 1942, as a Supermarine Spitfire-equipped fighter squadron manned by Norwegians.

History

In World War II (1942–1945) 
The squadron became operational on 21 March 1942, and moved on to RAF North Weald to operate alongside another Norwegian crewed squadron, No. 331 Squadron.

With squadron code "AH", No. 332 squadron became part of No. 132 Wing alongside Norwegian No. 331 Squadron.  It operated as air cover for the Dieppe Raid, and later flew fighter sweeps and escort operations over occupied France and the Low Countries. In late 1943/early 1944 both squadrons were transferred to the 2nd Tactical Air Force and participated in the Normandy Landings as fighter-bombers and tactical air superiority fighters. From September onwards No. 132 Wing participated in the liberation of the Netherlands.

In April 1945, the squadron was transferred to Scotland, and the following month transferred to Norway after the German surrender. On 21 September 1945, the squadron was disbanded at Værnes as an RAF unit and passed to the control of the Royal Norwegian Air Force (RNoAF). During the war between them, No. 331 and No. 332 Squadrons scored many air victories: 180 confirmed destroyed, 35 probables and more than 100 damaged. Combined losses were heavy as well: 131 aircraft lost with 71 pilots killed.

In the Royal Norwegian Air Force (1945–present)
In honour of its achievements during World War II, the Royal Norwegian Air Force has maintained its RAF squadron names. Thus, the RNoAF still has the fighter units 331 Squadron and 332 Squadron. Today, the Norwegian 332 Squadron is based at Ørland Air Station where it operates the Lockheed Martin F-35A Lightning II.

Notable pilots
Sgt Per Bergsland (Captured August 1942)
Sgt Carl Sejersted Bødtker (April 1943)
Sgt Jan Staubo
Cpt Finn Thorsager
Lt Soren Kjell Liby
Lt Marius Eriksen
Gunnar Piltingsrud
Fnr Ola Gert Aanjesen
Maj Reidar Emil From
Otto Grieg Tidemand - later Norwegian Minister of Defence 1965-70

Aircraft operated
Aircraft operated include:

Supermarine Spitfire Mk.Va (January 1942 – April 1942)
Supermarine Spitfire Mk.Vb (April 1942 – November 1942; May 1943 – June 1943)
Supermarine Spitfire Mk.IXb (November 1942 – April 1945)
Supermarine Spitfire Mk.IXe (April 1945 – 1952)
Republic F-84G Thunderjet (1953 – 1957)
North American F-86F Sabre (1957 – 1962)
North American F-86K Sabre (1962 – 1964)
Northrop F-5A Freedom Fighter (1966 – 1973)
Fokker (GD) F-16A Fighting Falcon (1980 – 2001)
Fokker (GD) F-16AM Fighting Falcon (2001 – July 2016)
Lockheed Martin F-35A Lightning II (November 2017 – present)

See also
List of Royal Air Force aircraft squadrons

References

Notes

Bibliography

 Halley, James J. The Squadrons of the Royal Air Force & Commonwealth, 1918–1988. Tonbridge, Kent, UK: Air-Britain (Historians) Ltd., 1988. .
 Rawlings, John D.R. Fighter Squadrons of the RAF and their Aircraft. London: Macdonald and Jane's (Publishers) Ltd., 1969 (new edition 1976, reprinted 1978). .

External links

 RAF official website Squadron history
 Historical photos from the No. 332 Squadron during WW2
 Article about 331 and 332 squadron during WW2
 ML407 – The Norwegian Story
 Article about the No.331-332 Squadrons' 60th anniversary visit to North Weald Airfield

Royal Air Force aircraft squadrons
Royal Norwegian Air Force squadrons
Military units and formations of Norway in World War II